Highways by Night is a 1942 American crime drama film directed by Peter Godfrey from a screenplay by Lynn Root and Frank Fenton, based on the story Silver Spoon, by Clarence Budington Kelland.  The film stars Richard Carlson and Jane Randolph.

Plot

Cast
 Richard Carlson as Tommy Van Steel
 Jane Randolph as Peggy Fogarty
 Jane Darwell as Grandma Fogarty
 Barton MacLane as Leo Bronson
 Ray Collins as Ben Van Steel
 Gordon Jones as 'Footsy' Fogarty
 Renee Godfrey as Ellen Cromwell
 Iris Adrian as Blonde Chorine
 Jack La Rue as Johnny Lieber - Gangster
 John McGuire as James 'Duke' Wellington
 George Cleveland as Judkins - Hotel Manager
 Marten Lamont as Reggie
 James Seay as Westbrook - Man with Trucks
 Cliff Clark as Police Captain James
 Paul Fix as Gabby

References

External links
 

1942 films
1940s crime comedy-drama films
American crime comedy-drama films
American black-and-white films
Films scored by Roy Webb
Films based on short fiction
Films directed by Peter Godfrey
RKO Pictures films
Trucker films
1942 crime films
1942 comedy films
1942 drama films
1940s English-language films
1940s American films